Park Lane is a major road in the City of Westminster, in Central London.

Park Lane may also refer to:

Buildings
 Park Lane (mall), a shopping mall in Halifax, Canada
 Park Lane (stadium), a rugby stadium in Whitefield, near Manchester, UK
 Park Lane Centre, a demolished mall in Reno, Nevada, USA
 Park Lane Hotel (Manhattan), former flagship of Harry Helmsley's hotel empire, New York, USA
 Park Lane by CMP, a shopping center in Taichung, Taiwan

Other uses
 Park Lane Academy, a secondary school in Halifax, UK
 Park Lane (investment bank), an investment bank in Los Angeles, USA
 Park Lane College, a former college in Leeds and Keighley amalgamated into Leeds City College
 Park Lane (DART station), a light rail station in Dallas, Texas, USA
 Park Lane Interchange, a transport interchange in Sunderland, UK

Streets
 Park Lane, Croydon, a road within Croydon
 Park Lane, Singapore, a road within Seletar Aerospace Park

See also 
 Lane Park, a large park in Birmingham, Alabama, USA
 Mercury Park Lane, a car produced by the Ford Motor Company
 parallel parking lane, a lane to park in, see Parallel parking
 Letters from the Fire, an American hard rock band previously known as Park Lane